Dúnchad mac Murchada (died 728) was a King of Leinster from the Uí Dúnlainge branch of the Laigin. He was the son of Murchad mac Brain Mut (died 727), the previous king. He ruled from 727 to 728.

Biography

Dunchad participated in his father's great victory over the Ui Neill and the high king Fergal mac Máele Dúin (died 722) of the Cenél nEógain at the Battle of Allen in 722. Dunchad succeeded his father as king in 727. He defeated his Uí Cheinnselaig rival Laidcnén mac Con Mella who was slain at the Battle of Maistiu (Mullaghmast, south Co.Kildare) in 727. The next year in 728, however he was defeated and slain by his brother Fáelán mac Murchado (died  738) at the Battle of Ailenn (Co.Kildare) who took the kingship and his widow.

Dunchad was married to Taileflaith ingen Cathail, the daughter of Cathal mac Finguine (died 742), the King of Munster. He was ancestor of the Uí Dúnchada sept of the Ui Dunlainge with their royal seat at Líamhain (Lyons Hill, on the Dublin-Kildare border). His son Cellach mac Dúnchada (died 776) was a king of Leinster.

Notes

See also
Kings of Leinster

References 

 Annals of Ulster at CELT: Corpus of Electronic Texts at University College Cork
 Annals of Tigernach at CELT: Corpus of Electronic Texts at University College Cork
 Byrne, Francis John (2001), Irish Kings and High-Kings, Dublin: Four Courts Press,

External links
CELT: Corpus of Electronic Texts at University College Cork

Kings of Leinster
Kings of Uí Dúnlainge
728 deaths
8th-century Irish monarchs
8th-century Irish people
People from County Dublin
People from County Kildare
People from County Wicklow
Year of birth unknown